King's Creek is a creek in Rockwall and Kaufman counties in Texas.

Course
King's Creek flows from central Rockwall County south past US 80, I—20, US 175, and SH 274 into Cedar Creek Lake, a reservoir near Kemp.

Before being dammed, it flowed into Cedar Creek, which is a tributary of the Trinity River.

See also
List of rivers of Texas

Rivers of Texas
Trinity River (Texas)
Rivers of Kaufman County, Texas
Rivers of Rockwall County, Texas